Will Owen (1901–1981) was a British miner and politician accused of giving secrets to Czechoslovakia.

Will Owen may also refer to:

 Will Owen (cricketer) (born 1988), Welsh cricketer who plays for Cheshire
 Will Owen (illustrator) (1869–1957), English book illustrator, cartoonist, caricaturist and a commercial and poster artist
 Will Owen (rugby union) (born 1995), English rugby union player who plays flanker for Leicester Tigers
 Will Owen (racing driver) (born 1995), American racing driver

See also
William Owen (disambiguation)
Bill Owen (disambiguation)
William Owens (disambiguation)